Below is a list of current and former members of the U.S. Congressional Progressive Caucus.

Current Senate members 

 Bernie Sanders (I-Vermont)

Current House members

Former members 

 Thomas Andrews (ME-1) – defeated in run for Senate in 1994
 Tammy Baldwin (WI-2) – elected to Senate in 2012
 Bob Brady (PA-1) – left caucus
 Sherrod Brown (OH-13) – elected to Senate in 2006
 Roland Burris (IL Senate) – retired from Congress in 2010
 Mike Capuano (MA-7) – defeated for re-nomination in 2018 by current caucus member Ayanna Pressley
 Julia Carson (IN-7) – died in 2007
 Donna M. Christensen (Virgin Islands) – retired from Congress in 2014
 Gil Cisneros (CA-39) – defeated for re-election in 2020
 Hansen Clarke (MI-13) – defeated for re-nomination in 2012
 Lacy Clay (MO-1) – defeated for re-nomination in 2020 by current caucus member Cori Bush
 Emanuel Cleaver (MO-5) – left caucus
 John Conyers (MI-13) – resigned from Congress in 2017
 Angie Craig (MN-2) – left caucus
 Elijah Cummings (MD-7) – died in 2019
 Peter DeFazio (OR-4) – retired from Congress in 2022
 Donna Edwards (MD-4) – defeated in run for Senate in 2016
 Keith Ellison (MN-5) – elected Attorney General of Minnesota in 2018
 Lane Evans (IL-17) – retired from Congress in 2006
 Chaka Fattah (PA-2) – defeated for re-nomination in 2016 by current caucus member Dwight Evans
 Russ Feingold (WI Senate) – defeated for re-election in 2010
 Bob Filner (CA-51) – retired from Congress in 2012
 Barney Frank (MA-4) – retired from Congress in 2012
 Marcia Fudge (OH-11) – became Secretary of Housing and Urban Development in 2021
 Tulsi Gabbard (HI-2) – retired from Congress in 2020
 Alan Grayson (FL-8) (FL-9) – defeated in run for Senate in 2016
 Luis Gutierrez (IL-4) – retired from Congress in 2018
 Deb Haaland (NM-1) – became Secretary of the Interior in 2021
 John Hall (NY-19) – defeated for re-election in 2010
 Phil Hare (IL-17) – defeated for re-election in 2010
 Katie Hill (CA-25) – resigned from Congress in 2019
 Maurice Hinchey (NY-22) – retired from Congress in 2012
 Mazie Hirono (HI-2) – elected to Senate in 2012
 Mike Honda (CA-17) – defeated for re-election in 2016 by current caucus member Ro Khanna
 Rush Holt (NJ-12) – retired from Congress in 2014
 Jesse Jackson, Jr. (IL-2) – resigned in 2012
 Joe Kennedy III (MA-04) - retired to run for Senate in 2020 (lost to incumbent Ed Markey)
 Ruben Kihuen (NV-4) – retired from Congress in 2018
 Carolyn Cheeks Kilpatrick (MI-13) – defeated for re-nomination in 2010
 Dennis Kucinich (OH-10) – defeated for re-nomination in 2012
 John Lewis (GA-5) - died in 2020
 Dave Loebsack (IA-2) - retired from Congress in 2020
 Ed Markey (MA-5) – elected to Senate in 2013
 Eric Massa (NY-29) – resigned from Congress in 2010
 Cynthia McKinney (GA-4) – defeated for re-nomination in 2008 by current caucus member Hank Johnson
 Brad Miller (NC-13) – retired from Congress in 2012
 George Miller (CA-11) – retired from Congress in 2014
 Jim Moran (VA-8) – retired from Congress in 2014
 Debbie Mucarsel-Powell (FL-26) - defeated for re-election in 2020
 Rick Nolan (MN-8) – retired from Congress in 2018
 John Olver (MA-1) – retired from Congress in 2012
 Major Owens (NY-11) – retired from Congress in 2006
 Ed Pastor (AZ-7) – retired from Congress in 2014
 Nancy Pelosi (CA-8) – left caucus when elected House Minority Leader
 Jared Polis (CO-2) – elected Governor of Colorado in 2018
 Carol Shea-Porter (NH-1) – retired from Congress in 2018
 Laura Richardson (CA-37) – defeated for re-election in 2012
 Lucille Roybal-Allard (CA-40) – left caucus
 Bobby Rush (IL-1) – left caucus
 José E. Serrano (NY-15) - retired from Congress in 2020
 Louise Slaughter (NY-25) – died in 2018
 Hilda Solis (CA-32) – became Secretary of Labor in 2009
 Pete Stark (CA-13) – defeated for re-election in 2012
 Bennie Thompson (MS-2) – left caucus
 John Tierney (MA-6) – defeated for re-nomination in 2014
 Stephanie Tubbs Jones (OH-11) – died in 2008
 Henry Waxman (CA-33) – retired from Congress in 2014
 Peter Welch (VT at-Large) – elected to Senate in 2022
 Paul Wellstone (MN Senate) – died in 2002
 Robert Wexler (FL-19) – resigned in 2010
 Lynn Woolsey (CA-6) – retired from Congress in 2012

External links 
Official website

Progressive
Democratic Party (United States) organizations
Progressive organizations in the United States
Organizations established in 1991
1991 establishments in Washington, D.C.
Factions in the Democratic Party (United States)